Adolfo Aizen (Ekaterinoslav, June 10, 1907 – Rio de Janeiro, May 10, 1991) was a Russian Empire-born Brazilian journalist and editor. He grew up in Salvador, moving to Rio de Janeiro at the age of 15. In Rio, he worked at the publisher O Malho, responsible for the magazine O Tico-Tico, the first magazine to publish comics in Brazil. In 1945, Aizen founded Editora Brasil-América Limitada (EBAL), which would become the most important Brazilian comic book publishing house until the 1980s (the publisher was closed in 1995), being responsible for publishing comics like Superman, Batman and Prince Valiant, among others. In 2000, Aiezen was awarded posthumously with the title of "Master of the National Comics" by Prêmio Angelo Agostini.

References

External links
 Lambiek Comiclopedia biography.

Brazilian publishers (people)
Comic book publishers (people)
Comic book editors

1907 births
1991 deaths
Prêmio Angelo Agostini winners
Brazilian people of Russian-Jewish descent
Emigrants from the Russian Empire to Brazil